FC Přední Kopanina is a football club located in Prague-Přední Kopanina, Czech Republic. It currently plays in the Division C, the fourth tier of the Czech football system. The club reached the second round of the 2010–11 Czech Cup.

Honours
Prague Championship (fifth tier)
 Champions 2008–09, 2014–15

References

External links
 Official website 
 FC Přední Kopanina at the website of the Prague Football Association 
 Profile at soccerway.com

Football clubs in the Czech Republic
Sport in Prague
Association football clubs established in 1934